Mader House is a historic home located at Poughkeepsie, Dutchess County, New York.  It was built about 1925 and is a -story, three-bay-wide bungalow-style dwelling with a low-pitched roof.  It is sheathed in pink stucco and sits on a raised basement.  It features a spacious front porch and large multi-paned windows.

It was designed by architect Percival M. Lloyd. Lloyd has nine buildings on the National Register, including the Hudson Valley's first skyscraper - a six story bank building also in Poughkeepsie.

It was added to the National Register of Historic Places in 1982.

References

Houses on the National Register of Historic Places in New York (state)
American Craftsman architecture in New York (state)
Houses completed in 1925
Houses in Poughkeepsie, New York
National Register of Historic Places in Poughkeepsie, New York